Jim Hart may refer to:

Sports
 Jim Hart (American football) (born 1944), American football quarterback
 Jim Hart (manager) (1855–1919), American baseball manager
 Jim Ray Hart (1941–2016), American baseball third baseman in 1960s and '70s
 Jimmy Hart (baseball) (1875–1926), American baseball third baseman in 1901

Others
 Jim Hart (artist) (born 1952), Canadian and Haida woodcarver and jeweler
 Jim Hart (musician), vibraphonist, drummer and composer
 Jim Hart (British Columbia politician) (born 1955), Canadian politician
 Jim Hart (Ontario politician), Toronto city councillor
 Jimmy Hart (born 1943), American professional wrestling manager and singer

See also 
 James Hart (disambiguation)